William Joseph Schallert (July 6, 1922 – May 8, 2016) was an American character actor who appeared in dozens of television shows and films over a career spanning more than 60 years. He is known for his roles on Richard Diamond, Private Detective (1957–1959), Death Valley Days (1955–1962), and The Patty Duke Show (1963–1966).

Early life and career
William Schallert was born in Los Angeles, California, the son of Edwin Francis Schallert, a longtime drama critic for the Los Angeles Times, and Elza Emily Schallert (née Baumgarten), a magazine writer and radio host. He began acting while a student at the University of California, Los Angeles (UCLA) but left to become an Army Air  Corps fighter pilot in World War II. He returned to UCLA after the war and graduated in 1946. In 1946, he helped found the Circle Theatre with Sydney Chaplin and several fellow students. In 1948, Schallert was directed by Sydney's father, Charlie Chaplin, in a staging of W. Somerset Maugham's Rain. In 1949, Schallert served as the reciter in a concert performance of Arnold Schoenberg's Ode to Napoleon in celebration of the composer's 75th birthday.

Schallert appeared in supporting roles on numerous television programs starting in the early 1950s, including four episodes (and three different characters) in Dick Powell's Zane Grey Theatre between 1958 and 1961. He was in three episodes of The Rifleman and four episodes of Gunsmoke : season 3, episode 16 "Twelfth Night" in 1957, season 4, episode 16 "Gypsum Hills Feud" in 1958, and as Col. Grant in season 7, episode 27 "Wagon Girls" in 1962, and banker Ezra Thorpe in "The Money Store" season 14, episode 14. Schallert portrayed farmer Sam Becker in a 1961 episode of The Andy Griffith Show, whose newborn son is delivered by Andy. He appeared in The Partridge Family as a very humble folk-singing guitar player in "Stage Fright" in 1971. He appeared three times as Major Karl Richmond on NBC's Steve Canyon, starring Dean Fredericks in the title role.

Schallert also appeared in several films. He had roles in The Man from Planet X (1951) with Robert Clarke, The Tarnished Angels (1958) with Robert Stack, Blue Denim (1959) with Brandon deWilde, Pillow Talk (1959) with Doris Day and Rock Hudson, In The Heat Of The Night (1967) with Sidney Poitier, Speedway (1968) with Elvis Presley, The Jerk (1979) with Steve Martin, Teachers (1984) with Nick Nolte, and Innerspace (1987), in which he played Martin Short's doctor. Schallert was a founding member of the Circle Players at The Circle Theatre, started in 1946, now known as El Centro Theatre.

Among eight appearances on the syndicated western anthology series Death Valley Days, Schallert in 1955 portrayed American Civil War General Jesse Lee Reno in the episode "Reno." In the story line, two veterans of the Mexican War who served under Reno (played by Frank Griffin and Stanley Clements) honor him with the naming of the second-largest city in Nevada. He appeared as Sam Clemens in a 1962 episode, "The $275,000 Sack of Flour." He appeared in an episode of the TV series In The Heat of The Night, where he portrays a husband who kills his terminally ill wife, as Carl Tibbets, owner of a book store in Sparta. Thus he appeared in both the 1967 film as the mayor and the 1992 episode of the TV show.

Schallert starred in Philbert, an innovative 1964 television pilot for ABC, which combined live-action camera work and animation. It was created by Warner Bros. animator Friz Freleng and directed by Richard Donner. ABC backed out of the series shortly before full production was to begin, although the completed pilot was released in theaters by Warner Brothers as a short subject.

Schallert was probably best known as Martin Lane on The Patty Duke Show. He also appeared as a wise teacher, Mr. Leander Pomfritt, on The Many Loves of Dobie Gillis and as "The Admiral" on Get Smart. On the two former shows he worked opposite actress Jean Byron. Schallert made three guest appearances on CBS's Perry Mason between 1957 and 1962, including the role of Donald Graves in the series' fifth episode "The Case of the Sulky Girl," as Dr. Bradbury in the 1961 episode "The Case of the Misguided Missile," and as Len Dykes in the 1962 episode "The Case of the Melancholy Marksman." He played the role of Nilz Baris in the Star Trek episode "The Trouble with Tribbles"; and much later he portrayed Varani, a Bajoran musician, in the Star Trek: Deep Space Nine episode "Sanctuary."

Schallert played the role of Carson Drew in the television series The Hardy Boys/Nancy Drew Mysteries (1977–1979), featuring Pamela Sue Martin as Nancy Drew. In addition to his onscreen performances, Schallert did voice-over work for numerous television and radio commercials over the years. Among these was a recurring role as "Milton the Toaster" in animated commercials for Kellogg's Pop-Tarts. He had the distinction of appearing in both the original film version of In the Heat of the Night (1967) and the later NBC TV version in 1992. In 2004, TV Guide recognized Schallert's portrayal of Martin Lane on The Patty Duke Show as No. 39 on its list of "50 Greatest TV Dads."

Later career/SAG president

Schallert served as president of the Screen Actors Guild (SAG) from 1979 to 1981, and afterwards remained active in SAG projects, including serving as a trustee of the SAG Pension and Health Plans since 1983, and of the Motion Picture and Television Fund since 1977. (His former co-star and television daughter, Patty Duke, also served as SAG president from 1985 to 1988.) During Schallert's tenure as SAG president, he founded the Committee for Performers with Disabilities, and in 1993 he was awarded the Ralph Morgan Award for service to the Guild.

Schallert continued to work steadily as an actor in later life, appearing in a 2007 episode of How I Met Your Mother, the HBO television film Recount (2008) as U.S. Supreme Court Associate Justice John Paul Stevens, and the HBO series True Blood and his distinctive voice brought him work for commercial and animation voiceovers. Appearances in 2009 included a guest role on Desperate Housewives on March 15, in which he played the role of a small newspaper editor; he also appeared in an episode of According to Jim. More recently, he appeared in the January 21, 2010, pilot episode of The Deep End on ABC as a retiring CEO with Alzheimer's disease. He also made an appearance on Medium on the February 5, 2010, episode and a cameo on the June 26, 2011, season premiere of True Blood as the mayor of Bon Temps. He played Max Devore in the A&E adaptation of Bag of Bones.

In 2010, Schallert made a series of public service announcement videos with Patty Duke and other castmates from The Patty Duke Show for the Social Security Administration, which can be found at www.ssa.gov. His last television appearance came in 2014 on an episode of the sitcom 2 Broke Girls.

Personal life
In a 2014 interview, Schallert said that he was suffering from peripheral neuropathy, forcing him to wear leg braces while effectively "confining" him to a wheelchair. He said about his condition and the leg braces: "They help me stay balanced if I use a walker, but it’s just easier to get around in a wheelchair." While not ruling out working on stage in the future, he said: "Working in film or TV would be too difficult now. Besides, I did my share!"

Schallert was married to actress Leah Waggner (born Rosemarie Diann Waggner) from 1949 until her death in 2015. She appeared with him in various shows, including episodes of The Patty Duke Show and The Dick Van Dyke Show. They had four sons: William Joseph, Jr. (born in 1949), Edwin G. (born in 1952), Mark M. (born in 1954), and Brendan C. Schallert (born in 1961).

Schallert died on May 8, 2016, at his home in Pacific Palisades at the age of 93, six weeks after the death of his on-screen daughter Patty Duke, on March 29.

Selected filmography

 Doctor Jim (1947) as George Brant (film debut)
 Lonely Heart Bandits (1950) as Dave Clark
 The Man from Planet X (1951) as Dr. Mears
 The Red Badge of Courage (1951) as a Union Soldier (uncredited)
 Rose of Cimarron (1952) as Gold Bullion Guard
 Just This Once (1952) as Secretary (scenes deleted)
 Storm Over Tibet (1952) as Aylen
 Captive Women (1952) as Carver
 Flat Top (1952) as Ens. Longfellow
 Sword of Venus (1953) as Valmont
 Port Sinister (1953) as Collins
 Down Three Dark Streets (1954) as murdered gas-station attendant (uncredited)
 Riot in Cell Block 11 (1954) as Reporter
  Them! (1954) as Ambulance Attendant (uncredited)
 The High and the Mighty (1954) as Dispatcher
 Gog (1954) as Engle
 Shield for Murder (1954) as Assistant D.A.
 Smoke Signal (1955) as Pvt. Livingston
 An Annapolis Story (1955) as Tony's Instructor (scenes deleted)
 Top of the World (1955) as Capt. Harding
 Hell's Horizon (1955) as Capt. Ben Morgan
 Raw Edge (1956) as Missionary
 Gunslinger (1956) as Marshal Scott Hood
 Written on the Wind (1956) as Reporter
 The Incredible Shrinking Man (1957) as Doctor Arthur Bramson
 The Tattered Dress (1957) as Court Clerk
 The Girl in the Kremlin (1957) as Jacob Stalin
 The Story of Mankind (1957) as Earl of Warwick
 The Tarnished Angels (1957) as Ted Baker
 Man in the Shadow (1957) as Jim Shaney
 Cry Terror! (1958) as Henderson, Bank Representative
 Pillow Talk (1959) as Hotel Clerk
 The Gallant Hours (1960) as Capt. Thomas G. "Tom" Lamphier, Jr.
 Lonely Are the Brave (1962) as Harry
 Paradise Alley (1962) as Jack Williams
 Shotgun Wedding (1963) as Preacher Parsons
 In the Heat of the Night (1967) as Mayor Schubert
 Hour of the Gun (1967) as Herman Spicer
 Will Penny (1967) as Dr. Fraker
 Speedway (1968) as Abel Esterlake
 Sam Whiskey (1969) as Mr. Perkins
 The Computer Wore Tennis Shoes (1969) as Professor Quigley
 Colossus: The Forbin Project (1970) as CIA Director Grauber
 Tora! Tora! Tora! (1970) as Harry Hopkins - Roosevelt's Aide (scenes cut)
 The Trial of the Catonsville Nine (1972) as Judge
 Charley Varrick (1973) as San Miguel Sheriff Bill Horton
 Hijack! (1973, TV Movie) as Frank Kleiner
 Peege (1973, Short) as Dad
 The Strongest Man in the World (1975) as Prof. Quigley
 Tunnel Vision (1976) as Francis X. Cody
 Dawn: Portrait of a Teenage Runaway (1976, TV Movie) as Harry
 Hangar 18 (1980) as Professor Mills
 Peter-No-Tail (1981) as Additional Voices (English version)
 Twilight Zone: The Movie (1983) as Father (segment "It's a Good Life")
 Teachers (1984) as Horn
 Innerspace (1987) as Dr. Greenbush
 House Party 2 (1991) as Dean Kramer
 Shake, Rattle and Rock! (1994, TV Movie) as Judge Boone
 Sweetzer (2007) as Barnaby

Television appearances 

 It's a Great Life (1955-1956, 2 episodes) as Travel Bureau Clerk / 3rd Telephone Man
 Mr. Adams and Eve (1957, 2 episodes) as Claude / Briggs
 Leave It to Beaver (1957) as Mr. Bloomgarden
 The Gray Ghost (1957) as Ebans
 The Adventures of Jim Bowie (1957-1958, 8 episodes) as Justinian Tebbs / Teeters Hill
 Gunsmoke (1958 S4 Ep16 'Gypsum Hills Feud') as Alben Peavy.
 The George Burns and Gracie Allen Show (1955-1958) as The Army Sergeant / The Waiter / Charlie Irwin Jr. / Pete
 Father Knows Best (1958) as Jennings
 The Jeannie Carson Show (1958, 4 episodes) as Herbert
 The Ray Bolger Show (1958)
 Maverick (1959) as Carl
 Peter Gunn (1959) as First Vice President
 Richard Diamond, Private Detective (1957-1959) as Charlie Kane / Johnny Prescott / Charlie
 The Donna Reed Show (1959) as Bert Rose
 Wanted Dead or Alive (1958-1959) as Link Damon / Craig the Bartender / James Hendricks / Hotel Clerk
 Lawman (1960) as Reed Smith
 The DuPont Show with June Allyson (1960) as Lt. Barnes
 Johnny Midnight (1960) as Richard Bissell
 The Twilight Zone (1960, TV series) as Policeman
 Johnny Ringo (1959-1960) as Tom Ferris / Bogan
 Sea Hunt (1960) as Dr. Ken Madison
 Bat Masterson (1960) as diamond expert Dr. Harold Dunsmore
 Dante (1960) as Prof. Louis Hastings
 The Rifleman (1959-1961) as Joe Lovering / Marshall Truce / Fogarty
 Coronado 9 (1961) as Alfred Bates
 The Andy Griffith Show (1961) as Sam Becker
 The Rebel (1961) as Charles Ashbaugh
 Alfred Hitchcock Presents (1962) as Lt. Gunderson
 Gunsmoke (1962) as Captain Grant 
 Hennesey (1961–1962, 2 episodes) as Conrad Musk / Wally Shafer, Jr.
 The Dick Van Dyke Show (1962) as Rev. Kirk
 Bonanza (1962, "Look to the Stars") as George Norton
 Perry Mason (1957-1962) as Len Dykes / Dr. Bradbury / Donald Graves
 The Many Loves of Dobie Gillis (1959-1962) as Mr. Leander Pomfritt / Prof. Leander Pomfritt
 Death Valley Days (1955-1962) as Sam Clemens / Dave Meiser / Carl Sprenger / Charlie Tetlow / Ellis Higby / Jesse Lee Reno / Albert Johnson / Mr. Loomis
 Hazel (1963) as Kemper
 Have Gun – Will Travel (1957-1963) as Chee Yan / Dallas Burchfield / Soldier / Clyde Broderick
 Empire (1963) as Sully Mason
 Rawhide (1959-1963) as Lieutenant Carter / Lt. Hill / The Salesman
 The Lucy Show (1963) as Mr. Cresant
 The Patty Duke Show (1963-1966) as Martin Lane / Kenneth Lane / Uncle Jed Lane
 The Virginian (1966) as Harry Foley
 Combat! (1966) as Major Fisher
 The Rat Patrol (1967) as Dr. Schneidermann
 Mission: Impossible (1967) as Dr. Harrison Selby
 Star Trek (1967) as Nilz Baris
 The Wild Wild West (1967-1969) as Frank Harper / Rufus Krause / Silas Grigsby
 Here Come the Brides (1969) as Reverend Gaddings 
 The Mod Squad (1969) as Father Bob Hughes
 Bewitched (1969) as Dr. Anton
 Room 222 (1969) as Dr. Charles Garrett
 Land of the Giants (1969, Season 2, The Clones) as Dr. Arno
 Get Smart (1967-1970) as Admiral Hargrade / Earl Kibbee
 Hawaii Five-O (1969-1970) as Defense Counsel Herbert / Craig Wilkie
 The Partridge Family (1971) as Red Woodloe
 Kung Fu (1973) as Willis Roper
 Gunsmoke (1957-1973) as Judge Ray Cordelius / Jake Spence / Ezra Thorpe / Jess / Capt. Grant / Alben Peavy / Eben Hakes
 The Girl with Something Extra (1973) as Mr. Everett
 Love, American Style (1973) as Louis (segment "Love and Carmen Lopez") / Steve (segment "Love and the Favorite Family")
 The Six Million Dollar Man (1974) as Lorin Sandusky
 Barnaby Jones (1974) as Mr. Freels
 The Bionic Woman (1976) as Bill Elgin
 The Hardy Boys/Nancy Drew Mysteries (1977–1979) as Carson Drew
 One Day at a Time (1978) as Mr. Morton
 Little Women (1978, TV Mini-Series) as Jonathan March
 Archie Bunker's Place (1979) as Dr. Wakeford
 Blind Ambition (1979, TV Mini-Series) as Herbert Kalmbach
 Little House on the Prairie (1976-1979) as Dean Russell Harmon / Snell
 The Waltons (1980-1981, in Seasons 8 and 9) as Stanley Perkins, the salesman and Rose's beau
 Lou Grant (1979-1982) as Frank Obler / Mark Worth
 Magnum, P.I. (1983) as Bob, the Foster Father
 North and South: Book II (1986, TV miniseries) as Gen. Robert E. Lee
 Highway to Heaven (1987) as Grandpa Raines
 Matlock (1987) as Judge Elliot Franklin
 The New Gidget (1986-1988, TV series) as Russ Lawrence
 Midnight Caller (1989) as Paul Drude
 War and Remembrance (1988-1989, TV miniseries) as Harry Hopkins
 Quantum Leap (1989) as Judge Eugene Haller
 Murphy Brown (1990) as Ken Hamilton, Murphy Brown's retired journalism teacher
 In the Heat of the Night (1990) as Carl Tibbetts
 "Decadence Dance" (Extreme) music video (1990) as president of "Parents for a Wholesome America"
 The Torkelsons (1991-1992) as Wesley Hodges
 Dinosaurs (1992) as Wesayso Scientist (voice)
 Star Trek: Deep Space Nine (1993) as Varani
 Coach (1994) as Bert Wilkins
 My Name Is Earl (2007) as Dr Rudin
 How I Met Your Mother (2007) as Brady
 The Suite Life of Zack & Cody (2008) as David
 Desperate Housewives (2009) as Ken
 According to Jim (2009) as Ed
 Green Lantern: First Flight (2009) as Appa Ali Apsa (voice)
 The Deep End (2010) as Hal Douglas
 Bag of Bones (2011, TV miniseries) as Max Devore
 Two Broke Girls, (2014) last screen role

Video games
 The Bard's Tale'' (2004)

References

External links 
 
 
 William Schallert Interview at Elvis2001.net
 Hollywood Everyman: A Conversation with William Schallert 2010 Interview with William Schallert
 

1922 births
2016 deaths
20th-century American male actors
21st-century American male actors
American trade union leaders
American male film actors
American male television actors
American male voice actors
Male actors from Los Angeles
Military personnel from California
Presidents of the Screen Actors Guild
United States Army Air Forces pilots of World War II
American World War II fighter pilots
University of California, Los Angeles alumni